is a Japanese light novel series, written by Toru Toba and illustrated by fal_maro. SB Creative has released the light novel series since May 2018 under their GA Bunko label. The light novel is licensed in North America by Yen Press. A manga adaptation with art by Emuda has been serialized online since October 2019 via Square Enix's online manga magazine Manga UP!. An anime television series adaptation by Yokohama Animation Laboratory aired from January to March 2022.

Plot
In the far north of the continent of Varno lies the small country of the Kingdom of Natra. Ever since King Owen collapsed from illness, the job of running the country falls to Owen's extremely competent son, Crown Prince, now Prince Regent, Wein Salema Arbalest. Alongside his beautiful and capable aide, Ninym Ralei, Wein upholds the image of a genius prince that leads the nation with an iron hand. However, behind the scenes, Wein constantly bemoans the fate that has been shoved upon him, quietly hoping for an opportunity to commit treason by selling off his home country and escaping from his duties.

Characters

Main characters
 
 
 The protagonist, Prince Wein is the extremely capable heir to the royal line of the Kingdom of Natra. He is lauded as a genius and is loved by the citizens of his country. However, underneath his princely facade lies a treasonous attitude of wanting to ignore all of his duties as much as he possibly can which normally ends with pain inflicted on him by his aide, Ninym. During the anime, there were multiple occasions which showed that Wein and Ninym’s affection for each other goes beyond that of close friend.
 
 
She is a close friend and personal aide to Prince Wein who comes from an oppressed minority known as the Flahm. Ninym also attended the Empire's Royal Academy with Wein. She is aware of his treasonous side but she pushes him to do what is right because she knows he has the intelligence, foresight, diligence and martial prowess to save the kingdom and everyone he and she are close to from evil forces. While she said that she could never wed Wein due to the distinct difference in their social status, it could be seen that she deeply values Wein’s declaration that “she is his heart”.

Kingdom of Natra
 
 
 The younger sister of Prince Wein, Princess Falanya studies politics in the hopes that she can eventually help her older brother despite believing her older brother to not have any faults that she can fill in. She was finally able to fulfil this wish in the Mealtars incident as it was Falanya that provided the breakthrough necessary for her older brother to concoct his plan to outwit his opposing conspirators.
 
 
 He is Princess Falanya's ninja bodyguard.

Earthwold Empire
 
 
 The second princess of the Earthwold Empire. Friends with Wein and Ninym when they attended the Academy, she pretended to be Lowa the daughter of a rural aristocrat.
 
 
 Ambassador between the Empire and the Kingdom of Natra.

Kingdom of Solgest

Kingdom of Marden
 
 
 A resistance army leader of the Kingdom of Marden aimed to retake her kingdom after Cavarin's attack. She is also the first and oldest princess named Zenovia Marden.

Other characters

Media

Light novel
The light novel is written by Toru Toba and illustrated by fal_maro. SB Creative has released eleven volumes since May 2018 under their GA Bunko label. The light novel is licensed in North America by Yen Press, and the first volume was released digitally on September 3, 2019.

Manga
A manga adaptation with art by Emuda has been serialized online since October 2019 via Square Enix's online manga magazine Manga UP!.  It has been collected in eight tankōbon volumes.

Anime
An anime television series adaptation by was announced during a livestream for the "GA Fes 2021" event on January 31, 2021. The series is produced by NBCUniversal Entertainment Japan and animated by Yokohama Animation Laboratory, with Makoto Tamagawa serving as director, Xin Ya Cai serving as assistant director, Deko Akao handling series composition, Ryūnosuke Ōji designing characters, and Toshihiko Sahashi composing the music. The opening theme song, "Level", is performed by Nagi Yanagi in collaboration with The Sixth Lie, while the ending theme song, "Hitori to Kimi to" (Alone and With You), is performed by Yoshino Nanjō. The series aired from January 11 to March 29, 2022 on Tokyo MX, BS NTV, and AT-X. 

Funimation licensed the series outside of Asia, and the license eventually transferred to Crunchyroll after Sony's acquisition of the company. On March 7, 2022, Funimation announced that the series would receive an English dub, which premiered the following day. Muse Communication licensed the series in South and Southeast Asia; and is available to watch on Muse Asia's YouTube channel and its regional variants, iQIYI, Bilibili in Southeast Asia, Catchplay in Indonesia and Singapore, meWATCH in Singapore, TrueId in Thailand, as well as Genflix and Sushiroll in Indonesia. 

NBCUniversal Entertainment Japan released the series in Japan across 4 Blu-ray volumes, each volume containing 3 episodes. The first volume was released on March 30, 2022, with subsequent volumes releasing monthly until June 29, 2022. Crunchyroll released the complete series on Blu-ray in North America on January 17, 2023.

Episode list

References

External links
  
  
  
 

2018 Japanese novels
2022 anime television series debuts
Anime and manga based on light novels
Comedy anime and manga
Crunchyroll anime
Fantasy anime and manga
GA Bunko
Gangan Comics manga
Japanese webcomics
Light novels
Muse Communication
NBCUniversal Entertainment Japan
Shōnen manga
Webcomics in print
Yen Press titles
Yokohama Animation Laboratory